Joshua Dewey (April 7, 1767 – February 23, 1864) was an American politician and veteran of the American Revolutionary War and the War of 1812.

Dewey was born in Lebanon, Connecticut, April 7, 1767, where his father, Daniel Dewey, resided as a farmer. The son was fitted
for college in his native town, at the Lebanon School of the well-known "Master Tisdale", Nathan Tisdale.

After the burning of New London in the Battle of Groton Heights in 1781, he shouldered his musket and became for a time one of the garrison of Fort Griswold on the Thames River.

Dewey graduated from Yale College in 1787. From 1859 until his death, Dewey was the oldest living graduate of Yale.

He removed in 1791 to Cooperstown, New York, and taught a school in which James Fenimore Cooper is said to have learned the alphabet. Two years later he became a farmer in that neighborhood and began to enter into public life. He was thrice elected a member of the New York Legislature, and was afterwards commissioned by President John Adams as a Collector of Internal Revenue, In 1809, he removed to the new town of De Kalb, New York, where he also exercised various political functions, being a supervisor of the town, a county magistrate and a commissioner of schools. In the War of 1812, he joined the militia for a short time in the defense of Ogdensburg, New York. In 1817, he became a religious man, and with his wife and four children united with a Presbyterian Church.

In 1830, he removed to Watertown, New York, and subsequently to Sackets Harbor, New York, and then to Auburn, New York. In his later years, he has resided with his son Lewis, in Brooklyn, (where he attended the church of Rev T L Cuyler,) and also with his daughter, Mrs Woolsey Butterfield, at whose house in Watertown he died, Feb 23, 1864. in his ninety-seventh year.  In late years he has repeatedly attended the Commencements of Yale College. His mind was clear and his health good till the close of his days.

In 1787, he married Miss Lora Loomis (dau. of Israel Loomis and Rebeckah Bingham), who died in 1841.

References

External links

1767 births
1864 deaths
People from Lebanon, Connecticut
Yale College alumni
Members of the New York State Assembly
People of Connecticut in the American Revolution
People from New York (state) in the War of 1812
People of colonial Connecticut